The coat of arms of Mauritius are stipulated in the "Mauritius Laws 1990 Vol.2 SCHEDULE (Section 2)". In the lower left quarter is a key and on the right-hand side is a white star, which are referred to in the Latin motto "Stella Clavisque Maris Indici" meaning "Star and Key of the Indian Ocean".

Blazon 
The armorial ensigns and supporters of Mauritius are officially described as:

(a) for arms-
 Quarterly azure and or.
 In the first quarter a lymphad or.
 In the second, 3 palm trees vert.
 In the third, a key in pale the wards downwards gules.
 In the issuant, from the base a pile, and in chief a mullet argent.

(b) for the supporters-
 On the dexter side, a dodo per bend sinister embattled gules and argent, and
 On the sinister side, a sambar deer per bend embattled argent and gules, each supporting a sugar cane erect proper,

(c) with the motto "Stella Clavisque Maris Indici" (lat: Star and Key of the Indian Ocean)

Colour code
Azure – Royal Blue (Pantone Reflex Blue)
Or – Gold (Metallic Gold)
Vert –	Emerald Green (Pantone Green)
Gules – Warm Red (Pantone 2X)
Argent – Silver (Metallic Silver)

References

National coats of arms
National symbols of Mauritius
Symbols introduced in 1906
Coats of arms with trees
Coats of arms with ships
Coats of arms with keys
Coats of arms with stars
Coats of arms with birds
Coats of arms with deer
Coats of arms with sugarcane
National emblems with birds
Dodo